Following the chief complaint in medical history taking, a history of the present illness (abbreviated HPI) (termed history of presenting complaint (HPC) in the UK) refers to a detailed interview prompted by the chief complaint or presenting symptom (for example, pain).

Questions to include
Different sources include different questions to be asked while conducting an HPI.

Several acronyms have been developed to categorize the appropriate questions to include.

The Centers for Medicare and Medicaid Services has published criteria for what constitutes a reimbursable HPI. A "brief HPI" constitutes one to three of these elements. An "extended HPI" includes four or more of these elements.

Also usable is SOCRATES. For chronic pain, the Stanford Five may be assessed to understand the pain experience from the patient's primary belief system.

See also
 Medical record
 Medical history
 Pain scale

References

External links
 Overview at medicine.ucsd.edu
 Overview at medinfo.ufl.edu

Medical terminology